WGVV-LP (92.5 FM, "Groove 92.5") is a low-power FM radio station licensed to serve the community of Rock Island, Illinois. The station is owned by Quad Cities Community Broadcasting. It airs an urban contemporary music format.

The station was assigned the WGVV-LP call sign by the Federal Communications Commission on May 8, 2003.

WGVV-LP is licensed for HD radio (hybrid digital) operation.

References

External links
 Groove 92.5 official website
 

GVV-LP
GVV-LP
Urban contemporary radio stations in the United States
Radio stations established in 2004